Ervine Pyrah Mosby (1877–1916), also referred to as Irving Mosby, was an English professional rugby league footballer who played between 1901 and 1911. He played at representative level for Yorkshire and England, and at club leveland Bradford R.F.C.  He had previously played rugby union for Leicester.

Background
Mosby was born in Normanton, West Riding of Yorkshire, England, and he died aged 38 in Bradford, West Riding of Yorkshire, England.

Playing career

International honours
Mosby won a cap for England while at Bradford FC in 1905 against Other Nationalities.

Championship final appearances
Mosby played right- and scored a goal in Bradford FC's 5-0 victory over Salford in the Championship tiebreaker during the 1903–04 season at Thrum Hall, Halifax on Thursday 28 April 1904, in front of a crowd of 12,000.

County Cup Final appearances
Mosby played in Bradford FC's 8-5 victory over Hull Kingston Rovers in the 1906 Yorkshire Cup Final at Belle Vue, Wakefield on Saturday 1 December 1906.

References

External links
[http://www.rlhp.co.uk/imagedetail.asp?id=1432 Image 
[http://www.rlhp.co.uk/imagedetail.asp?id=1433 Image 
[http://www.rlhp.co.uk/imagedetail.asp?id=1469 Image 

1877 births
1916 deaths
Bradford F.C. players
England national rugby league team players
English rugby league players
Rugby league players from Leeds
Place of death missing